The inaugural race in the Talladega 500 (now Yellawood 500) series was held on September 14, 1969, at Alabama International Motor Speedway in Talladega, Alabama, USA.

Background

Talladega Superspeedway – originally known as Alabama International Motor Superspeedway (AIMS) – is a motorsports complex located north of Talladega, Alabama. It is located on the former Anniston Air Force Base in the small city of Lincoln. The track is a tri-oval and was constructed by International Speedway Corporation, a business controlled by the France Family, in the 1960s. Talladega is most known for its steep banking and the unique location of the start/finish line - located just past the exit to pit road. The track currently hosts the NASCAR series such as the Cup Series, Xfinity Series, and the Gander Outdoors Truck Series.

Summary

Tires controversy and "The Worst NASCAR Race Ever" 
The race is primarily remembered because all of the NASCAR stars from the Professional Driver Association (PDA), led by Richard Petty, boycotted the race due to tire failures during tire testing.

During tire testing, drivers reported handling problems on their cars. When checking their tires, drivers noticed that the tires were destroyed. The problem occurred throughout the garage. NASCAR was going through a "tire war" at the time, in which two competing tire manufacturers tried to convince teams and drivers to use their tires because they lasted longer, they gripped firmer, etc. Problems did occur with tire wars, due to tire manufacturers sacrificing safety for the sake of speed and thus, more tire blowouts which led to more injuries. Firestone and Goodyear, the two manufacturers that happened to be running in the race, flew in harder compound tires, which made the tires last longer. However, on Thursday, the next day, the same issues still happened, and the tires showed no improvements. The next day, on Friday, the drivers were becoming increasingly angry and frustrated. Firestone decided to pull out of the event and let the drivers pull out of their contracts for the race, allowing them to choose whichever tire they wished to run. However, Goodyear decided to stay, hoping to win the war and prove that their tires were better than Firestone's. 

During all of this, drivers looked towards the PDA, essentially a union, and asked them what they should do. NASCAR president Bill France hated the PDA and unions in his sport (shown by his banning of Curtis Turner for trying to start a union in 1961, although by that time he had been reinstated in 1965), but couldn't do anything to ban them due to the major publicity it would cause. Instead, France never acknowledged that the PDA even existed. The PDA decided to complain to France about the issues they were having and talk solutions. The PDA offered to postpone the race until a tire compound that could withstand the track was made. Bill France refused this idea, partly due to the fact that Alabama International Motor Speedway was barely completed before the race and that France needed his money back as quick as possible. Throughout the garage, drivers talked about what they should do. Some hoped Goodyear could bring a tire soon, some wanted to continue the protests, and some even wanted to boycott the race. France would try to calm the drivers down by running a slower pony car than what the drivers had, running about at 160 mph when drivers were hitting much faster speeds. When drivers point out the speed difference, France said to the drivers "Why don't you just run at that speed?" Drivers took this as a major insult, as they thought it undermined what they do, and the fact that someone would break that rule anyway if they ran it. Sometime during Friday, France was talking to Bobby Allison and LeeRoy Yarbrough, when France said to Allison "I think you're just afraid to race." Per Allison, LeeRoy from behind swung and hit France in the face, putting him on the ground. LeeRoy would proceed to say to the drivers nearby, "Boys, pack up your stuff, we're leaving." Word quickly spread, and most of the PDA with the exception of Richard Brickhouse (who was coerced by Chrysler to drive their new car), packed up and left. Jim Vandiver and Bobby Isaac, who were not with the PDA, proceed to stay at the speedway. 

Worried that the boycott would adversely affect the fan attendance, Bill France Sr. offered fans free admission to the 1970 Daytona 500 if they bought tickets to this race. France also decided to add that the drivers who ran in the preliminary 400 mile race, running slower cars, could also run in the feature race. On the morning before race day, Goodyear flew in a new set of tires that ran the entire race without failure.

Bobby Isaac won the pole for the race.

The race also introduced the Dodge Charger Daytona cars for the first time in the series. Richard Brickhouse won the race; it was his only victory in the Cup Series. 

John Hill, Jake Elder, Harry Hyde, and Mack Howard were the most notable crew chiefs to witness the race. The transition to purpose-built racecars began in the early 1960s and occurred gradually over that decade.

The PDA disbanded soon after their boycott, with the next union-like organization in NASCAR not occurring again until the Race Team Alliance was formed in 2014.

Scoring debacle 
Ray Fox and Jim Vandiver, whose No. 3 car finished second, were convinced that they actually lapped Brickhouse and won, but the win stood. The radio commentators also thought that Vandiver was in the lead, saying

To the day he died, Vandiver believed that he won the race. Conspiracy theorists cite the difference in the Dodges as the determining factor since Jim was in an older Charger 500 and Brickhouse was in the brand new, winged Dodge Daytona. Therefore, Chrysler talked Bill France into inventing a scoring error and showed that Brickhouse was the winner.

Drivers involved in the 1969 boycott
 Richard Petty (President of the PDA)
 David Pearson
 Bobby Allison
 Donnie Allison
 Cale Yarborough
 James Hylton
 Wendell Scott
 Buddy Baker
 Charlie Glotzbach
 LeeRoy Yarbrough
 Ramo Stott
 Jack Ingram
 Tiny Lund
 Bobby Johns
 John Sears
 Paul Goldsmith
 Dave Marcis

Results

References

Talladega 500
Talladega 500
NASCAR races at Talladega Superspeedway
Boycotts of events
NASCAR controversies
September 1969 sports events in the United States